Kazumasa Hashimoto (born 1974 in Tokyo, Japan) is a Japanese composer, mastering engineer and web designer.

As a child, Hashimoto learned classical piano, starting to compose in high school while making music on his computer. He majored in composition at Tokyo College of Music. His minimalistic music is a rich blend of electronic textures and acoustic instruments such as cello, violin and clarinet. Hashimoto makes extensive use of the piano, as well as nonsense, collage-like lyrics constructed from digitally edited voice samples.

As a pianist he has collaborated with Japanese electronica artist World's End Girlfriend, world music artist Souichiro Suzuki, and singer Yukawa Shione. In 2005 he was featured on Childish Music, an anthology of music compiled by Ekkehard Ehlers in "an attempt to define a new genre" of "naive sounds".  In 2008, Hashimoto scored the critically acclaimed film, Tokyo Sonata.

Discography 
 Yupi (2003)
 Epitaph (2004)
 Gllia (2006)
 Euphoriam (2007)
 "Tokyo Sonata" (2008)
 strangeness (2010)

Contributions 
 out (2001)
 warter garden (2003)
 cinema soundtrack ー間ー (2003)
 fork ends (2004)
 Childish Music (2005)
 We are all cotton hearted (2006)

References

External links
 Kazumasa Hashimoto Official Website
 Kazumasa Hashimoto on Noble Label
 Review of Kazumasa Hashimoto's Yupi by Plop

1974 births
Ambient musicians
Japanese electronic musicians
Japanese male musicians
Living people
Musicians from Tokyo